Kung Fu Factory is an American video game developer located in Los Angeles, California in the United States. The company was formerly known as Just Games Interactive, which developed Mortal Kombat: Unchained and Mortal Kombat: Armageddon, and worked on UFC Undisputed 2009. Kung Fu Factory is the first third party developer to have worked on a Mortal Kombat game.  Recently the company has released several #1 Mobile games including the Adventure Time: Card Wars Series, SpongeBob Moves In, and Teenage Mutant Ninja Turtles: Rooftop Run. The company's latest Top Grossing mobile F2P game is WWE Champions, which was developed in partnership with Scopely and WWE. On February 19, 2021, it was announced by Kung Fu Factory that a majority stake of the company was acquired by Netmarble.

Games
Mobile games

 NBA Ball Stars (TBA)
Hotel Transylvania: Blast (2019)
 Pacific Rim: Breach Wars (2018) 
 WWE Champions (2017) 
 Adventure Time: Card Wars Kingdoms (2016) 
 Card King: Dragon Wars (2015) 
 Pirate Bash (2014) 
 Adventure Time: Card Wars (2014) 
 Slot Revolution (2013) 
 Domo Jump (2013) 
 Teenage Mutant Ninja Turtles: Rooftop Run (2013) 
 SpongeBob Moves In (2013) 
 Alone In The Dark - iOS port (2014) 

Console games
 Spartacus Legends (2013) 
 Bellator: MMA Onslaught (2012) 
 Girl Fight (2012) 
 Supremacy MMA: Unrestricted (2012) 
 Supremacy MMA (2011)
 Hello Kitty Seasons

As Just Games Interactive
 Mortal Kombat: Unchained
 Mortal Kombat: Armageddon
 Cruis'n

References

External links

Video game companies established in 2002
2002 establishments in California
Companies based in Los Angeles
Video game companies of the United States
Video game development companies